Muisca cuisine describes the food and preparation the Muisca elaborated. The Muisca were an advanced civilization inhabiting the central highlands of the Colombian Andes (Altiplano Cundiboyacense) before the Spanish conquest of the Muisca in the 1530s. Their diet and cuisine consisted of many endemic flora and fauna of Colombia. 

The main product of the Muisca was maize, in various forms. The advantage of maize was that it could be grown in the various climatic zones the Muisca territories experienced. It was the basis for their diet and the alcoholic drink, chicha, made from fermented maize and sugar. 

In the Muisca religion their agriculture and celebration of harvests, conducted along the complex Muisca calendar, were protected by Chaquén and Nencatacoa. The Muisca ate a variety of roots and tubers and even had a specific word in their Chibcha language for eating those: bgysqua.

Muisca cuisine 

The Muisca cultivated many different crops in their own regions, part of the Muisca Confederation, and obtained more exotic culinary treats through trade with neighbouring indigenous peoples, with as most important; the Lache (cotton, tobacco, tropical fruits, sea snails), Muzo (emeralds, Magdalena River fish, access to gold, spices), Achagua (coca, feathers, yopó, Llanos Basin fish, curare). 

The climatic variation of the Muisca territories allowed for the agriculture of different crops. Javier Ocampo López describes the Muisca diet as predominantly vegetarian: potatoes, maize, beans, mandioca, tomatoes, calabazas, peppers and numerous fruits. The Muisca also used grains known today as quinoa. 

The main base for the Muisca cuisine was maize, considered a holy crop. The Muisca roasted corn (maize), ate it off the plant or converted it into popcorn. 

Main meat was the guinea pig, endemic to South America, which they farmed in their homes. In special cases they ate llamas, alpacas, deer, capybara (chigüiro in Spanish), and fish from the rivers and lakes of the Altiplano Cundiboyacense and Magdalena and Llanos through trade. The Muisca drank a lot of chicha, a fermented alcoholic drink of maize and sugar, served in ceramic pots called urdu or aryballus.

Paleodietary studies performed on the Bogotá savanna, where 18 Muisca skeletons ranging in historical age from 8th to 10th century AD and 26 skeletons from the 12th and 13th century AD, together with analysis of 10 mummies of the Guane, Lache and Muisca were analysed, have shown that about 60% of the food of the people consisted of vegetary products and 40% of meat and especially fish.

After the Spanish conquest, the access to meat was drastically reduced changing the diet of the Muisca and other indigenous groups of central Colombia. Studies from Tunja, called Hunza in the time of the Muisca, have shown the people did not suffer from malnutrition though.

Words for maize 

As maize was the most important crop and food for the Muisca, their language (Muysccubun) had many different words for maize, parts of the plant and the different processes and eating habits.

Plants 

The Muisca cultivated their crops in so-called camellones, artificially elevated surfaces that allowed the roots of the crops to be sufficiently irrigated with the average 700-1000 mm of rain a year and drainage systems regulating the water levels.

Main plants to be cultivated were:
 Canna edulis or achira, one of the first plants cultivated in the Andes
 Tropaeolum tuberosum, ideally grown at high altitudes exceeding 
 Oxalis tuberosa—although this root is not native to Colombia, it was used by pre-Columbian societies in Cundinamarca and Boyacá, after being introduced from its place of origin in Peru, where the majority of varieties are found
 Ullucus tuberosus or ulluco, used in various traditional dishes, still today
 Yacón, eaten raw, usually with a bit of salt, also eaten traditionally today
 Solanum tuberosum, Solanum colombianum,  Solanum andigens, Solanum rybinii and Solanum boyacense, different types of potatoes were a lesser part of the Muisca diet; maize was more important
 Manihot esculenta or yuca, a very important tuber in the diet of the South American indigenous people, cultivated as of 1120 BCE and still one of the most important ingredients in Colombian and other Latin-American cuisine
 Ipomoea batatas, sweet potatoes, as evidenced from 3200 years before present in Zipacón

Grains and cereals 
 Zea mays or corn, earliest use of corn dated to 150 BCE in Zipaquirá, 275 BCE in Tequendama and even up to 2250 BCE
 Chenopodium quinoa, quinoa, originating from Peru, more than 5000 years before present
 Phaseolus vulgaris, common bean, first domesticated in Mexico, Central America, Peru and Colombia
 Arachis hypogaea, peanuts, grown in the Andes and in Alto Magdalena

Fruits 

 Inga feuilleei, where not the seeds yet the fruit was eaten
 Curcubita maxima and Curcubita pepo, pumpkins, earliest evidence from Zipacón already 3860 BCE
 Capsicum sp, such as C. pubescens, C. annuum, C. frutens, C. baccatum, peppers were common in the Americas and in Colombia, mainly product of trading with the U'wa (Tunebos)
 Ananas comosus, pineapple, widely grown
 Physalis peruviana or uchuva, typical fruit of Colombia, grown at altitudes above 
 Solanum quitoense or lulo, the national fruit of Colombia
 Passiflora, a wide variety of passionfruits, such as P. mixta, P. cumablensis, P. antioquiensis and P. ambigua and the largest species P. quadrangularis
 Persea americana or avocado
 Psidium guajava, guava
 Cyphomandra betacea, tree tomato
 Annona cherimola, A. muricata and A. squamosal
 Carica or papaya
 Vaccinium meridionale
 Rubus glaucus, R. macrocarpus and R. adenotrichus

Leaves 
 Galinsoga parviflora or guasca
 Erythroxylum coca or coca

Meat

Mammals 
 Cavia porcellus, or guinea pig (guy), widely domesticated in Muisca territories
 Odocoileus virginianus, Mazama rufina, M. americana and M. goazoubira, or species of deer
 Cuniculus taczanowskii, or mountain paca
 Armadillos
 Capybara, traded with Achagua towards Llanos Orientales

Birds 
As Colombia has the biggest biodiversity of birds in the world, they formed part of their cuisine, mainly:
 Colombian grebe
 Masked duck
 Ruddy duck
 Black-bellied whistling duck
 South Georgia pintail
 Cinnamon teal
 Southern pochard
 Spot-flanked gallinule
 American purple gallinule
 Yellow-eared parrot
 Gorgeted wood quail
 Eared dove

Fish 
 Eremophilus mutisii

Insects 
 Termites
 Hormiga culona,  a type of ant
 Chisas, larvae of beetles
 Worms
 Cockroaches

Food processing and preparation 
Using the abundant coal of the Muisca territories, they heated their ovens and cooked their food.

Eating habits 
The Muisca sat down on the ground while eating and they did not use cutlery, and ate with their hands. The food was served on leaves or in ceramic pots.

See also 
Muisca economy
Muisca agriculture
Aztec cuisine
Maya, Inca cuisine

References

Bibliography 
 
 
 
 
 
 
 

Native American cuisine
Pre-Columbian Native American cuisine
 
Muisca
Ancient dishes
Food and drink in Colombia